Augustine (30 July 1955 – 14 November 2013) was an Indian actor who worked in Malayalam cinema. He acted in more than 150 films, mainly in comedy, character and negative roles. Actress Ann Augustine is his daughter.

Personal life

Augustine was born on 30 July 1955 to Kunnumpurath Mathew and Rosi at Kodencheri, Kozhikode. He was married to Hansamma; the couple have two daughters: Ann (actress), and Jeethu.

Career

Beginning his acting career through theatre, Augustine entered the Malayalam film industry in the mid eighties through an uncredited role, in the movie Swapnalokam, starring Sreenath, in 1983. His first credited appearance was in Gandhinagar 2nd Street in 1986; the role had been offered to him by Sreenivasan for having assisted the latter in finding a filming location for Gandhinagar 2nd Street. Augustine also appeared in such films as Commissioner, Devasuram, Ekalavyan, Aaraam Thampuran, Kazhcha and Katha Paryumbol. He produced the Malayalam film, Mizhi Randilum.

Health and Death

Augustine suffered a stroke in late 2009; however, he made a partial recovery and continued acting. Following a fall in a hotel room in April 2013, he underwent treatment in Pattambi. But later, he was diagnosed with liver cirrhosis and finally died of kidney failure, aged 58, on 14 November 2013 at a private hospital in Kozhikode. Kadal Kadannu Oru Maathukutty was the last film in which he appeared.

Partial filmography

References

External links

1955 births
2013 deaths
Indian male film actors
Male actors from Kerala
Male actors in Malayalam cinema
People from Kozhikode district
Deaths from kidney failure
20th-century Indian male actors
21st-century Indian male actors